, also known as  or Lady Toku (November 11, 1559 – February 16, 1636) was a Japanese noble lady from the Sengoku period. She was a daughter of daimyō Oda Nobunaga and later married Matsudaira Nobuyasu, the first son of Tokugawa Ieyasu.  She is remembered as the person most responsible for the deaths of Nobuyasu and his mother, Ieyasu's wife, the Lady Tsukiyama.

Biography

Tokuhime was married to Tokugawa Ieyasu's five-year-old son Nobuyasu in 1563, when she herself was only five years old. Her marriage was politically motivated and was used to seal an alliance between Tokugawa Ieyasu and Oda Nobunaga.

As the years went by, Nobuyasu and Tokuhime became quite attached to each other, though Tokuhime's mother-in-law, the Lady Tsukiyama, made life quite difficult for her and interfered in matters between her and her husband.  Lady Tsukiyama was known as a jealous and contrary woman, and even her husband Ieyasu found it difficult to share the same residence as her. Because Tokuhime only gave birth to two daughters, Lady Tsukiyama took a daughter of a Takeda's retainer for Nobuyasu's concubine, and this action was irritating Tokuhime.

As a young woman, Tokuhime decided to retaliate against Lady Tsukiyama. When Tokuhime was about twenty, she had had enough of her mother-in-law's interference and wrote a letter to her father, Oda Nobunaga, conveying her suspicion that Lady Tsukiyama had been in correspondence with Takeda Katsuyori, one of Nobunaga's worst enemies.  Nobunaga relayed this suspicion of betrayal to his ally Ieyasu, who promptly had his wife imprisoned.  As Ieyasu needed to maintain his alliance with Nobunaga, the accusations were taken quite seriously, and as Lady Tsukiyama and her son were quite close, Ieyasu therefore had Nobuyasu put into custody.  No solid evidence of treachery was ever produced, but to assuage his ally, Ieyasu had his wife executed in 1579.  Ieyasu did not believe his son would betray him, but to prevent him from seeking vengeance for the death of his mother, he ordered Nobuyasu to commit suicide by seppuku where he was held at Futamata Castle.  Although Tokuhime wanted only to anonymously retaliate against Lady Tsukiyama, the situation snowballed, and by the end of 1579, her husband and her mother-in-law were dead and she was a widow.

Family
 Father: Oda Nobunaga (1536–1582)
 Brothers:
 Oda Nobutada (1557–1582)
 Oda Nobukatsu (1558–1630)
 Oda Nobutaka (1558–1583)
 Hashiba Hidekatsu (1567–1585)
 Oda Katsunaga (1568–1582)
 Oda Nobuhide (1571–1597)
 Oda Nobutaka (1576–1602)
 Oda Nobuyoshi (1573–1615)
 Oda Nobusada (1574–1624)
 Oda Nobuyoshi (died 1609)
 Oda Nagatsugu (died 1600)
 Oda Nobumasa (1554–1647)
 Sisters:
 Fuyuhime (1561–1641) Wife of Gamō Ujisato
 Hideko (died 1632)
 Eihime (1574–1623)
 Hōonin
 Sannomaru-dono (d. 1603) One of Toyotomi Hideyoshi's concubines.
 Tsuruhime
 Husband: Matsudaira Nobuyasu (1559–1579)
 children:
 Tokuhime
 Kumahime, married Honda Tadamasa

References

1559 births
1636 deaths
16th-century Japanese women
16th-century Japanese people
17th-century Japanese women
17th-century Japanese people
Japanese nobility
Matsudaira clan
Oda clan
Tokugawa clan
Women of medieval Japan